Kotekan is a style of playing fast interlocking parts in most varieties of Balinese Gamelan music, including Gamelan gong kebyar, Gamelan angklung, Gamelan jegog and others.

Kotekan are "sophisticated interlocking parts," "characteristic of gong kebyar and several other Balinese gamelan styles, that combine to create the illusion of a single melodic line that often sounds faster than any single human could possibly play." According to Colin McPhee: "Composed of two rhythmically opposing parts which...interlock to create a perpetual flow of sound, the kotekan adds sheen and intensity to the music, ...calls for the utmost rhythmic precision...[and] lies in the top register of the gamelan."

In Gamelan gong kebyar, Kotekan is usually played on the higher-pitched gangsa and reyong as embellishment to the main melody (pokok) played on the calung and ugal.

Note: In the transliteration of Balinese used here, the letter "c" represents a sound similar to English "ch".

Nyog cag 

Nyog cag is a straightforward alternation between polos and sangsih, each playing only every other note of a scale or other melodic figuration. Though structurally the simplest form of kotekan, nyog cag can be difficult to play accurately, especially because it is used at the fastest tempos.

Nyok cok 
Nyok cok is an ornamentation of the pokok melody in which polos and sangsih anticipate the next pitch of the pokok in unison and then each plays one of its neighbor tones.

Kotekan telu 

In kotekan telu, the polos and sangsih share a set of three pitches (telu means three in Balinese). One of the parts plays the low and middle pitches, the other plays the middle and high pitches. The middle pitch is always played in unison by both parts except if kotekan telu is played by the reyong, because the two or four players share the same set of pots.

Kotekan empat 

Kotekan empat is similar to kotekan telu, except in this case there are four pitches (empat means "four" in Balinese). One part plays the lower two and the other plays the upper two; there is no sharing of pitches. Usually the lowest and highest pitches are struck simultaneously, and the interval they form varies depending upon where the notes fall in the scale and the tuning of the ensemble.

Kotekan theory  

Kotekan are typically composed  by elaborating the pokok melody.  The subdivisions of the composite kotekan are usually played four or eight times faster than the pokok.  Since the kotekan patterns are either three notes (telu) or three sounds (the kotekan empat has two solo pitches plus the open interval), the simple patterns do not repeat every four or eight notes.  This can be illustrated in the following example:

 Kotekan 1 2 3 1 2 3 1 2 3 1 2 3 1 2 3 1 etc...
 Pokok   1 . . . 2 . . . 3 . . . 1 . . . etc...

The above is the most basic example of a kotekan telu.  In the example the numbers refer to the different pitches being played.  The kotekan is repeating the same pattern over and over.  Note that the pokok is exactly the same pattern played four times slower.  The kotekan would be divided into polos and sangsih as follows:

 Polos   1 2 . 1 2 . 1 2 . 1 2 . 1 2 . 1 etc...
 Sangsih . 2 3 . 2 3 . 2 3 . 2 3 . 2 3 . etc...
 Pokok   1 . . . 2 . . . 3 . . . 1 . . . etc...

If the pokok changes, the kotekan will follow it.  Here is a simple example that is similar to the first example except that it changes direction.

 Kotekan 1 2 3 1 2 3 1 2 3 2 1 3 2 1 3 2 etc...
 Pokok   1 . . . 2 . . . 3 . . . 2 . . . etc...

Notice that this example can repeat over and over.  Here is what the separate parts might look like:

 Polos   1 2 . 1 2 . 1 2 . 2 1 . 2 1 . 2 etc...
 Sangsih . 2 3 . 2 3 . 2 3 2 . 3 2 . 3 2 etc...
 Pokok   1 . . . 2 . . . 3 . . . 2 . . . etc...

Here is the same melody with kotekan empat:

 Polos   1 2 . 1 2 . 1 2 . 2 1 . 2 1 . 2 etc...
 Sangsih 4 . 3 4 . 3 4 . 3   4 3 . 4 3 . etc...
 Pokok   1 . . . 2 . . . 3 . . . 2 . . . etc...

The polos part is the same as the previous example.  However, the sangsih part is very different.

See also 

 Gamelan
 Hocket
 Imbal
 Panerusan
 Gatra
 Colotomy
 Gendhing structures
 Music of Indonesia
 Music of Java

References

Further reading 
Balinese Music (1991) by Michael Tenzer, .  Included is an excellent sampler CD of Balinese Music.
Gamelan Gong Kebyar: The Art of Twentieth-Century Balinese Music (2000) by Michael Tenzer.

External links
 Demonstration of kotekan on YouTube—Note: In this version, both performers are using the same instrument, which is not normally how it is performed.
 Demonstration of kotekan on YouTube
 An article on kotekan  by Wayne Vitale, published by the American Gamelan Institute in Vol. 4, No. 2 of the journal ''Balungan""

Gamelan theory